The third season of the American horror anthology television series American Horror Story, subtitled Coven, is set in 2013 New Orleans and follows a coven of witches descended from Salem as they fight for survival, and features flashbacks to the Salem witch trials in 1692, as well as the 1830s, 1910s, 1960s, 1970s, and 1990s. The ensemble cast includes Sarah Paulson, Taissa Farmiga, Frances Conroy, Evan Peters, Lily Rabe, Emma Roberts, Denis O'Hare, Kathy Bates, Jessica Lange, with all returning from previous seasons, except Roberts, Bassett, Sidibe, and Bates.

Created by Ryan Murphy and Brad Falchuk for cable network FX, the series is produced by 20th Century Fox Television. Coven was broadcast between October 9, 2013, to January 29, 2014, consisting of 13 episodes. Like its predecessors, the season was met with both positive reviews and strong ratings, with the premiere attracting a series high of 5.54 million viewers, which at the time was the most viewed episode of the series. The season garnered seventeen Primetime Emmy Award nominations, including Outstanding Miniseries. The performances (particularly those of Lange, Paulson, Conroy, Bates, Bassett, and Sidibe) received widespread acclaim, and five acting nominations for Lange, Paulson, Bassett, Conroy, and Bates at the 66th Primetime Emmy Awards, with Lange and Bates winning their respective categories. In addition, Coven was nominated Best Miniseries or TV Film at the Golden Globe Awards.

Cast and characters

Main

 Sarah Paulson as Cordelia Foxx 
 Taissa Farmiga as Zoe Benson 
 Frances Conroy as Myrtle Snow 
 Evan Peters as Kyle Spencer 
 Lily Rabe as Misty Day
 Emma Roberts as Madison Montgomery 
 Denis O'Hare as Spalding
 Kathy Bates as Delphine LaLaurie 
 Jessica Lange as Fiona Goode

Recurring
 Gabourey Sidibe as Queenie
 Jamie Brewer as Nan 
 Angela Bassett as Marie Laveau
 Danny Huston as the Axeman
 Josh Hamilton as Hank Foxx 
 Alexander Dreymon as Luke Ramsey 
 Patti LuPone as Joan Ramsey
 Dana Gourrier as Chantal 
 Lance Reddick as Papa Legba
 Michael Cristofer as Harrison Renard
 Leslie Jordan as Quentin Fleming
 Robin Bartlett as Cecily Pembroke
 Mike Colter as David
 Riley Voelkel as young Fiona Goode
 Ameer Baraka as Bastien the Minotaur

Guest stars
 Stevie Nicks as herself
 Alexandra Breckenridge as Kaylee
 Mare Winningham as Alicia Spencer
 Grey Damon as Brener
 Ian Anthony Dale as Dr. David Zhong
 Lance E. Nichols as Detective Sanchez
 Grace Gummer as Millie
 Andrew Leeds as Dr. Dunphy
 Gavin Stenhouse as Billy
 P.J. Boudousqué as Jimmy
 Kyle Secor as Bill
 Raeden Greer as Pauline LaLaurie
 Jennifer Lynn Warren as Borquita LaLaurie
 Ashlynn Ross as Marie Jeanne LaLaurie
 Scott Michael Jefferson as Louis LaLaurie
 Christine Ebersole as Anna-Lee Leighton
 Michelle Page as young Myrtle Snow
 James DuMont as Dr. Morrison

Episodes

Production

Conception
In January 2013, series co-creator Ryan Murphy hinted that a clue about the third season would be hidden in the tenth episode of the second season. In a later interview discussing that episode, he stated, "I sorta feel like for the third version I want to do something that's a little bit more 'evil glamour.' Just something that's a little bit more...one of the things that I missed this season was I really loved having that Romeo and Juliet youth story with Violet and Tate [from the first season]. I want something like that again, and we're doing something like that in the third season. And we're contemplating shooting the show in a different place. We're contemplating shooting it in a place in the country where true horror has been." In another interview, Murphy added that the season would be set in the modern-day.

Executive producer Tim Minear has stated that, while this season's tone might be lighter with more humor, the global themes of it will be "oppression of minorities of all kinds, and within that idea, minority groups going after each other and doing the work of the larger culture." He added, "While there is a strong feminist theme that runs throughout Coven, there are themes of race and themes of oppression, and themes of family – especially mothers and daughters."

Future season
In October 2016, Murphy stated that a future season of the show would feature a return/continuation of Coven. He stated that this is not the theme for season 7, but a later season. He also confirmed that Lady Gaga's character from Roanoke is the first Supreme. Later that month, Murphy announced that the season would be a Coven and Murder House crossover continuation. Merging stories, themes, and characters. He also stated that he had begun reaching out to actors from both seasons to reprise their respective roles. In 2018, Murphy announced the eighth season, Apocalypse, which would be the crossover season. Apocalypse follows the world after a nuclear holocaust, and the events leading up to the end of the world, principally, the witches' fight against Michael Langdon, the antichrist who was born in Murder House.

Casting
Series executive producers and co-creators Ryan Murphy and Brad Falchuk stated that, as with the second season, "many actors" would return for the third season in different roles. Jessica Lange, Evan Peters, and Sarah Paulson all confirmed their returns. Murphy added that Lange would portray a "real glamour-cat lady," whose name was later revealed to be Fiona Goode. Paulson said in an interview that her character would "definitely [be] different [to her season two character]." She added, "Basically, she's going to look different, and my relationship to Lange is going to be quite different this time. At the beginning of last season, no one knew that Lana would be the hero, so it's possible I could end up the evil one this year. As of right now, there will be some of Lana Winters' qualities in my character, but I don't know for sure." Taissa Farmiga, who played a lead role in the first season, starred as Zoe Benson, a character involved in a prominent romance with Peters' character. Lily Rabe and Frances Conroy portrayed series regulars Misty Day and Myrtle Snow, respectively. Kathy Bates co-starred as Delphine LaLaurie, an evil woman from the past who tortures her slaves. Murphy stated that Bates' character would be "five times worse than [her] Misery character" and is also inspired by a "true event." It was reported on May 22, 2013, that Emma Roberts would co-star as Madison Montgomery, a difficult Hollywood starlet.

In May 2013, Murphy announced via Twitter that Angela Bassett and Patti LuPone had joined the cast. Bassett later confirmed she would be playing voodoo priestess, Marie Laveau. In an interview, LuPone said that her character, Joan Ramsey, would not be a witch but "the personification of the religious right, 'like Piper Laurie in Carrie.'" Gabourey Sidibe appeared in 12 episodes of the season portraying Queenie, a young witch, whose prominent ability allows her to become a human voodoo doll. First season actress Jamie Brewer recurred as Nan, a young witch who is clairvoyant.

In July and August 2013, Murphy announced through Twitter that Murder House actors Denis O'Hare and Alexandra Breckenridge had joined the cast in unknown roles, later known as Spalding and Kaylee, respectively. Also in August, Murphy announced that Christine Ebersole would be playing a "Glinda the Good Witch-type of gal," who is Fiona's predecessor. In an interview, Jessica Lange revealed that Mare Winningham had joined the cast as Peters' character's mother, Alicia Spencer. Leslie Jordan announced that he had joined the cast as Quentin Fleming, a high-ranking witch. In September 2013, Alexander Dreymon was cast in the role of Luke Ramsey. Described as "the handsome young man who moves in next door to the Academy". Danny Huston, Josh Hamilton, and Lance Reddick all recurred throughout the season as the Axeman, Hank Foxx, and Papa Legba, respectively. Murphy also invited singer Stevie Nicks to be a part of the season. She appeared in two episodes, "The Magical Delights of Stevie Nicks" and "The Seven Wonders."

Filming
Principal photography for the season began on July 23, 2013 and concluded January 17, 2014, in New Orleans, Louisiana. The casting call reads, "After two seasons shooting in Los Angeles, the series moves to [New Orleans] for its third season. Filming begins July 23, 2013, in New Orleans, Louisiana and [will be] completed on January 17, 2014." Despite Ryan Murphy stating that the third season would take place in multiple cities, New Orleans is the primary setting of the third installment.

Marketing
Similar to the prior seasons, FX published mini teaser trailers for Coven on the show's Facebook page.

Reception

Critical response
American Horror Story: Coven received positive reviews from critics. The review aggregation website Rotten Tomatoes reported an 85% approval rating, with an average rating of 7.25/10, based on 221 reviews, becoming the best-reviewed season of the series on that site. The site's consensus reads, "A noteworthy ensemble cast combined with creepy storytelling and campy, outrageous thrills make American Horror Story: Coven a potently structured fright-fest." The season scored 71 out of 100 on Metacritic, based on 24 reviews.

Anne T Donahue of The Guardian stated that Coven "could be American Horror Story's best instalment yet," writing, "That's not to say Coven is perfect. It's been called out as glorified slave-torture porn in the US, and it's important that Madame LeLaurie's storyline comes full circle, and that slavery is handled in a responsible way. The same goes for Zoe's storyline, and the incidences of sexual assault within this season, too. But American Horror Story can handle it. And while it's obviously over-the-top, its broader social commentary makes it a unique series, unlike anything we've seen on television before. It's a conventional horror story, but it's America's horror story too. Just try making it through an episode without hiding behind the sofa." In their post-season reviews, The Michigan Daily gave Coven a B+, saying, "And while its conclusion, appropriately titled "The Seven Wonders", never quite matched the high standard it set for itself throughout the season, Covens reputation will nonetheless remain a solid one." Jeff Jensen of Entertainment Weekly gave the season a B rating and said, "I can't deny my experience: Week to week, the excesses of Coven were wickedly amusing. Next year, I hope American Horror Story can be more than that, and with less."

In contrast, Coven was also met with negative reviews from some critics. The A.V. Club gave the season a low rating of D+, with critic Emily VanDerWerff remarking, "It lurched drunkenly from idea to idea, never settling on one long enough to build anything of worth." Some critics, like Amanda Kay LeBlanc, state that the series is ineffective in completely opposing the ideas of racism, oppression, and racial conflict that are integral to Coven conception. "Although the narrative of Coven explicitly decries racism," she writes, "it simultaneously invests in colorblind racist narratives. Whiteness is central in Coven, operating through discourse that ignores racial difference and contemporary forms of oppression and erasure." She additionally argues that Coven excessively depends on and uses the imagery of violence against black people for entertainment and plot progression.

Awards and nominations

In its third season, the series was nominated for 74 awards, 14 of which were won.

Ratings

Covens premiere episode, "Bitchcraft", was watched by 5.54 million viewers, which, at the time, was the highest total viewers of any American Horror Story episode. It was surpassed by the fourth season's premiere, "Monsters Among Us", which received 6.13 million viewers during its broadcast. The ratings slipped for the second episode, delivering 4.51 million viewers and a 2.5 rating among adults 18-49 – down 17% from the premiere. The rest of the season's episodes remained relatively steady in ratings; the episode with the lowest viewing numbers was the penultimate episode, "Go to Hell".

Home media

Notes

References

External links

 
 

Fiction set in the 1830s
2013 American television seasons
2014 American television seasons
2010s American drama television series
American gothic fiction
American historical fiction
03
Dark fantasy television series
Ghosts in television
Incest in television
Fiction about Louisiana Voodoo
Mass murder in fiction
Matricide in fiction
Mythology in popular culture
Primetime Emmy Award-winning television series
Racism in television
Serial killers in television
Salem witch trials in fiction
Southern Gothic television series
Television about magic
Television shows about precognition
Television shows about telekinesis
Television series about cancer
Television series about witchcraft
Television series set in 2013
Television series set in the 2010s
Television shows set in New Orleans
Wizards in television
Zombies in television
Television series set in the 1960s
Television series set in the 1970s
Television series set in the 1990s
Television series set in the 17th century